The University of North Carolina at Chapel Hill men's basketball program honors fifty-one former players by hanging their jerseys in the rafters of the Dean E. Smith Center, the home to the men's basketball team on the university's campus. Of these, eight are both honored and retired. However, only seven jersey numbers are retired, as honoree Jack Cobb played before jersey numbers were the norm, meaning he had no number to retire. Justin Jackson and Joel Berry are the most recent players to be honored, following the 2016-17 season. Jackson qualified by being named the ACC Player of the Year and a first-team All-American. Berry was named the Most Outstanding Player of the 2017 Final Four.

Criteria

North Carolina requires that players must be recognized for excellence for their performance during the regular season, in post-season play, or in the Olympics. Specifically, a player's jersey qualifies for honoring if he receives one or more of the following five awards: first- or second-team All-America on one of the major All-American teams that qualify a player for a consensus All-American designation, an ACC Player of the Year, the Most Valuable Player of a National Championship-winning team (as voted by coaches and teammates), the NCAA basketball tournament Most Outstanding Player of a Final Four team, or a gold medal in basketball at the Olympics.

Additionally, a player can also achieve the even greater honor of having his jersey (along with his uniform number) permanently retired by the University of North Carolina. To attain jersey retirement, a Tar Heel must win one or more of the following six national player of the year awards: Associated Press, National Association of Basketball Coaches, Sporting News, John R. Wooden Award, Oscar Robertson Trophy, or the Naismith College Player of the Year. The (now defunct) Helms Foundation College Basketball Player of the Year award formerly served as a seventh option. The most recent player to merit bestowal of this honor is Tyler Hansbrough, who won all six of the national player of the year awards in his 2007–08 season.

Honored players
Players whose numbers are retired are shown with a blue background.

References